The long-finned pike or yellowfin pike (Dinolestes lewini) is a species of perciform fish, the only species in the genus Dinolestes, as well as the family Dinolestidae.

See also
List of fish families

References
 
 
 

long-finned pike
Marine fish of Southern Australia
Fish common names
long-finned pike
long-finned pike